is a Buddhist temple in Fuchū  neighborhood of the city of Ishioka, Ibaraki, Japan, belonging to the Shingon-shū Chizan-ha sect, and is the provincial temple ("kokubunji") of former Hitachi Province. The ruins of the Nara period temple and the nearby nunnery have been collectively protected as a National Historic Site since 1922. In 1952, the designation was upgraded to that of a Special National Historic Site.

Hitachi Kokubun-ji
The Shoku Nihongi records that in 741, as the country recovered from a major smallpox epidemic, Emperor Shōmu ordered that a monastery and nunnery be established in every province. These temples had the dual purpose of promoting Buddhism as the national religion of Japan and standardising control of the Yamato rule to the provinces.

The actual date the Hitachi Kokubun-ji was founded is unknown. Per the "Hitachi-Fuchū Kagami", the temple was founded in 743 and consecrated in 752 AD. The original design of the temple was a walled square compound measuring 270 meters east-to-west by 240 meters north-to-south. The compound contained a large South Gate, Middle Gate, Kondō, Lecture Hall, Cloisters, Rectory and a seven-story Pagoda, Kyōzō, Shōrō, Kuri, and dormitory.  However, as the buildings of the modern temple partially overlap the foundations of the ancient temple, the exact size and placement of many of the structures of the ancient temple are uncertain. The site was surveyed in 1977 and excavated in 1982 at which time it was estimated that the original Kondō was four times larger than the present temple's Hondō.The patterns on some of the roof tiles are identical to the eaves tiles found at the Heijō-kyō palace site in Nara, suggesting that experts from the central government were providing technical guidance when the temple was constructed. 

Per the Engishiki records of 927 AD, the temple was one of the richest in the kokubunji system in terms of rice revenue. The temple was destroyed once by a fire, some 80 years after it was founded, and again in 939 AD during the rebellion of Taira no Masakado. It was rebuilt both times, but was against largely destroyed by fire during the battles of the Satake clan in the Sengoku period, the last of which was in 1585. The temple went into rapid decline afterwards, and by the Keichō era (1596-1615) it did not even have a resident priest, but was reduced in status to that of a subsidiary chapel of a neighboring temple called the Senjū-in.

The current Hitachi Kokubun-ji was established in 1919 by the merger of Senjū-in with the remnant of the ancient Hitachi Kokubun-ji. The temple is about a ten-minute walk from Ishioka Station on the JR East Jōban Line.

Hitachi Kokubun-niji
The provincial nunnery, the  associated with the Hitachi Kokubun-ji was located about 600 meters to the northwest. The nunnery occupied a 164 meter square walled compound, within which the buildings were arranged in the manner of Tōdai-ji in Nara with a South Gate, Middle Gate, Kondō, and Lecture Hall arranged in a straight line. Cloisters from the left and right of the Middle Gate surrounded the Kondō and connected it to the Lecture Hall. Per the Shinpen Hitachi-no-kuni-shi, the nunnery was burned down during a battle involving the Satake clan in 1590.

Per an excavation conducted in1969, traces of moats that demarcate the temple with a width of about three meters were discovered in the west, south, and north sides.

See also
Provincial temple
List of Historic Sites of Japan (Ibaraki)

References

External links

Hitachi Kokubun-ji per Ishioka City home page 
Hitachi Kokubun-niji per Ishioka City home page 
Hitachi Kokubun-ji per Ibaraki Prefecture Board of Education ]
Hitachi Kokubun-niji per Ibaraki Prefecture Board of Education ]

Buddhist temples in Ibaraki Prefecture
Nara period
Ishioka, Ibaraki
History of Ibaraki Prefecture
Special Historic Sites
8th-century establishments in Japan
8th-century Buddhist temples
Buddhist archaeological sites in Japan